An ultra diffuse galaxy (UDG) is an extremely low luminosity galaxy, the first example of which was discovered in the nearby Virgo Cluster by Allan Sandage and Bruno Binggeli in 1984. These galaxies have been studied for many years prior to their renaming in 2015.  Their lack of luminosity is due to the lack of star-forming gas, which results in these galaxies being reservoirs of very old stellar populations.

Based on discoveries confirmed in 2018, this class of galaxies includes both extremes of dark matter content: Some UDGs consist almost entirely of dark matter (such a galaxy may have the same size and mass as the Milky Way but a visible star count of only 1%), while other UDGs appear to be almost entirely free of dark matter.

Examples
The distribution of ultra diffuse galaxies in the Coma Cluster is the same as luminous galaxies; this suggests that the cluster environment strips the gas from the galaxies, while allowing them to populate the cluster the same as more luminous galaxies. The similar distribution in the higher tidal force zones suggests a larger dark matter fraction to hold the galaxies together under the higher stress.

Dragonfly 44, an ultra diffuse galaxy in the Coma Cluster, is one example. Observations of its rotational speed suggest a mass of about one trillion solar masses, about the same as the mass of the Milky Way. This is also consistent with about 90 globular clusters observed around Dragonfly 44. However, the galaxy emits only 1% of the light emitted by the Milky Way. On 25 August 2016, astronomers reported that Dragonfly 44 may be made almost entirely of dark matter. However, later, spatially resolved kinematics measured a mass of about 160 billion solar mass, six times less than early mass measurements and 1 order of magnitude less than the Milky Way mass. The most recent work found 20 globular clusters around the galaxy, which is consistent with the recent mass measurement. The lack of X-ray emissions from the galaxy and surrounding area also show that the number of globular clusters can not be as many as was claimed before.

In 2018, the same authors reported the discovery that the ultra diffuse galaxy NGC 1052-DF2 is dark matter-free, based on velocity measurements of its ~10 globular cluster system. They concluded that this may rule out some alternative gravity theories like modified Newtonian dynamics, but leaves other theories, such as the external field effect still possible. Detailed simulations in the framework of Modified Newtonian Dynamics confirm that NGC 1052-DF2 is quite consistent with theoretical expectations.

In 2021, AGC 114905, an ultra-diffuse dwarf galaxy about 250 million light-years away, was reported to have almost no dark matter. However, this conclusion relies heavily on the galaxy having a moderate inclination of 32° between disc and sky planes, which is estimated from the somewhat oval appearance. Using detailed simulations of AGC 114905 in the alternative gravity theory known as Modified Newtonian Dynamics, it was shown that a disc galaxy with its properties can appear slightly oval even if viewed face-on due to disc self-gravity, in which case the rotation curve could be much higher and the galaxy could be quite consistent with theoretical expectations. An overestimated inclination is unlikely if galaxies are dominated by dark matter because then the disc is not self-gravitating, so it should be close to circular when viewed face-on.

See also
 
 
  or c-Diffuse galaxy type
  or Diffuse-type galaxy

Footnotes

References

Further reading
 
 
 

Galaxies